John Carter (died 1432) of Scarborough, Yorkshire, was an English politician.

Carter was probably the son of MP, John Carter.

He was a Member (MP) of the Parliament of England for Scarborough in 1411, 1420 and May 1421.

References

Year of birth missing
1432 deaths
Politicians from Scarborough, North Yorkshire
English MPs 1411
English MPs 1420
English MPs May 1421